The 1983 Missouri Valley Conference men's basketball tournament was after the conclusion of the 1982–1983 regular season. The quarterfinal and semifinal rounds were played on campus sites, with the final contested at Horton Field House on the campus of Illinois State University in Normal, Illinois.

Bracket

Note: * indicates host institution

References

1982–83 Missouri Valley Conference men's basketball season
Missouri Valley Conference men's basketball tournament
Missouri Valley Conference men's basketball tournament